Sergio Assisi (born 13 May 1972) is an Italian actor. He appeared in more than twenty films since 1999.

Selected filmography

References

External links 

1972 births
Living people
Italian male film actors
Italian male television actors